Torture in the State of Palestine refers to the use of torture and systematic degrading practices on civilians detained by Palestinian forces in the West Bank and the Gaza Strip. As of 2018, Amnesty reported that LGBT people were subjected to arbitrary arrest and ill-treatment.

History

Palestinian Authority
The Palestinian Authority had reportedly practiced torture in the Palestinian territories over the years. In 1995, Azzam Rahim, a naturalized American citizen, was arrested by the Palestinian Authority in the West Bank. He was subsequently taken to a prison in Jericho where he was tortured and killed. Rahim's family attempted to sue the PA and the Palestinian Liberation Organization, but the Supreme Court ultimately ruled against them.

In 2007, Amnesty International found that "Torture [by the Palestine Authority] of detainees remained widespread. Seven detainees died in custody. Unlawful killings, including possible extrajudicial executions, continued to be reported."

More than 100 cases of torture by Palestinian security services were reported in 2010. Joe Stork, deputy Middle East director at Human Rights Watch, said: "The reports of torture by Palestinian security services keep rolling in. President Abbas and Prime Minister Fayyad are well aware of the situation. They need to reverse this rampant impunity and make sure that those responsible are prosecuted."

At least six Palestinians died under torture in PA prisons. According to a report by the Arab Organization for Human Rights in Britain, the PA has used torture on a systematic basis for years. Methods include beatings with cables, pulling out nails, suspension from the ceiling, flogging, kicking, cursing, electric shocks, sexual harassment and the threat of rape. The report went on to say "Every one of those detainees has been subject to humiliating and degrading treatment and stayed in cells for more than 10 days. The analysis shows that an astonishing 95 percent of the detainees were subjected to severe torture, others feeling the detrimental effects on their health for varying periods." The Shabeh, which involves detainees being handcuffed and bound in stress positions for longs stretches of time, is the most widely used form of torture.

Human Rights Watch reported 147 cases of torture by Hamas in the West Bank during 2011 and that none of the perpetrators had been prosecuted "despite consistent allegations of severe abuse." It further stated that "Some men said they had needed medical care due to torture and sought to obtain medical records as evidence that they had been tortured, but that hospital officials refused to provide them. Hamas’s rival in the West Bank, the Fatah-dominated Palestinian Authority, arrests and detains Palestinians arbitrarily, including Hamas members or sympathizers, and similarly subjects detainees to torture and abuse."

In 2012, after allegedly selling a house in Hebron to a Jewish family, Muhammad Abu Shahala was arrested by the Palestinian Authority, tortured into a confession, and sentenced to death.

In another report, Human Rights Watch "documents cases in which [Palestinian] security forces tortured, beat, and arbitrarily detained journalists, confiscated their equipment, and barred them from leaving the West Bank and Gaza." HRW also reported an incident in which "the Hamas Ministry of Interior summoned a journalist who published an article on torture by Hamas authorities in secret detention facilities, threatened to take legal action against him if he did not publish an apology for the article, and warned him to correct his 'biased' reporting."

State of Palestine
While the State of Palestine’s ratified the Optional Protocol to the Convention against Torture and other Cruel, Inhuman or Degrading Treatment or Punishment on 29 December 2017, Palestinian security forces in the West Bank and Hamas security in Gaza continued using torture and other ill-treatment.

In 2018, The Independent Commission for Human Rights (ICHR) received 285 allegations of torture and other ill-treatment of detainees held by Palestinian security forces in the West Bank and by Hamas forces Gaza.

Also in 2018, the Human Rights Watch published that both Palestinian authorities and Hamas routinely arrest and torture opponents and critics, in what have been described as “parallel police states”.

Practices on minorities and foreigners

Israeli Arabs
In 2017, Israel sued Palestinian administration for reportedly arresting and torturing fifty Arab citizens of Israel over the period of 1990s and early 2000s.

Palestinian LGBT community
As of 2018, Amnesty reported that lesbian, gay, bisexual, transgender and intersex (LGBTI) people were subjected to arbitrary arrest and ill-treatment.

Palestinian converts to Judaism
In one case in 2019, it was reported that Palestinian police arrested and had badly beaten two Palestinians in Hebron, who had converted to Judaism. The two, a man in his fifties and his son, received injuries including burns on arms and legs. The case took place in October 2019.

Notes

Citations

 
Human rights abuses in the State of Palestine